Agustín "Auggie" Barrenechea (born May 20, 1979) is a former professional American football linebacker who played for eight years with the Hamilton Tiger-Cats and Edmonton Eskimos of the Canadian Football League. In 120 regular season games, Barrenechea racked up 240 defensive tackles, 55 special teams tackles, seven quarterback sacks and five interceptions. He secured the starting Middle Linebacker role his rookie year and proceeded to lead the Hamilton Defense in tackles in 2005 recording the franchise's 3rd highest single season defensive tackles. During his time in Edmonton he once again secured the starting Middle Linebacker position leading the Edmonton Eskimos in defensive tackles.

He was selected in the first round with the 10th pick by the Tiger-Cats in the 2003 CFL Draft. Barrenechea announced his retirement on March 7, 2012. He played CIS Football with the University of Calgary.

Other accomplishments include in 2010 the Hamilton Tiger-Cats nominee for the Jake Gaudaur Veterans' Award which recognizes a CFL player who best demonstrates leadership attributes of Canada's Veterans; 2005 the Hamilton Tiger-Cats Most Outstanding Canadian; University of Calgary Dino Football Team Hec Crighton Trophy-Most Outstanding Player and President's Award-Top Defensive Player.

References

External links
Hamilton Tiger-Cats bio

1979 births
Living people
Argentine expatriate sportspeople in Canada
Argentine people of Basque descent
Canadian football linebackers
Canadian football fullbacks
Calgary Dinos football players
Edmonton Elks players
Hamilton Tiger-Cats players
Sportspeople from Mar del Plata